Island Blue Records is part of Universal Records.

See also
 List of record labels

American record labels